The Jacob Shafer House is a historic farmhouse located in  Town of Montgomery in Orange County, New York. It is located on Kaisertown Road roughly a quarter-mile (400 m) south of NY 17K west of the village of Montgomery.  The house was built about 1842, and is a two-story, three bay, Greek Revival style frame dwelling with a -story wing. Also on the property are the contributing ruins of a barn complex and a stone lined well.  It was built by Jacob Shafer, a prominent resident of the town.

It was added to the National Register of Historic Places in 1996.

References

External links

Houses on the National Register of Historic Places in New York (state)
Houses in Orange County, New York
National Register of Historic Places in Orange County, New York
Houses completed in 1842
Greek Revival houses in New York (state)